Rams RFC is an English rugby union club based near the village of Sonning on the outskirts of Reading in the county of Berkshire. The first XV play in the third level league of the English rugby union system, National League 1, following their promotion from National League 2 South as champions at the end of the 2018–19 season. Up until 2018, the club was previously known as Redingensians and then Redingensians Rams before being renamed simply as Rams for the 2018–19 season onwards.

History 
Rams consist of five senior teams of differing playing ability and a full complement of mini and junior sides. The first team currently plays in National League 1 (level 3) of the rugby union league structure. The second team play in Canterbury Division 3, the third team play in Berks/Bucks & Oxon Prem A, and the fourths in Berks/Bucks & Oxon 1. The fifth team participates in the Thames Valley Invitational Leagues. Both the under-17s and colts play in division 1 of their respective Berks/Bucks & Oxon leagues. Rams RFC is also renowned for its Rugby 7s capability and participates in several major international tournaments across Europe from March through to August.

Ground 
Rams play home fixtures at Old Bath Road in the village of Sonning on the north-east outskirts of Reading.  As it is next to the A4 travel links are decent, with parking available at the ground and regular bus services going into Reading which is accessible by train.  
The ground consists of a main pitch next to a modern club-house, along with a number of other pitches for second XV and junior rugby.  The capacity is approximately 1,250 (all standing) around the main pitch and on the club-house balcony.

Honours 
1st team:
 Southern Counties champions: 1987–88
 Southern Counties South champions: 2000–01
 Southern Counties North champions: 2005–06
 South West Division 2 East champions: 2006–07
 National League 3 South West champions: 2014–15
 National League 2 South champions: 2018–19

2nd team:
 Berks/Bucks & Oxon Premier A champions: 2007–08

4th team:
 Berks/Bucks & Oxon 4 South champions: 2014–15
 Berks/Bucks & Oxon 3 champions: 2015–16

Current standings

Notable former players 
 Dennis Easby (DH Easby) - captain of Redingensians in 1950–51, Easby became the first person from the Berkshire RFU to become national RFU president in 1994–95. He died in 2017.

References

External links 
 Redingensians R.F.C. website

English rugby union teams
Rugby clubs established in 1924
Rugby union in Berkshire
Sonning
Sport in Reading, Berkshire